Lex Mahumet pseudoprophete is the translation of the Qur'an into Medieval Latin by Robert of Ketton ( 1110 – 1160 AD). It is the earliest translation of the Qur'an into a Western language.

In 1142 Peter the Venerable persuaded Robert to join a team he was creating to translate Arabic works into Latin in hopes of aiding the religious conversion of Muslims to Christianity. The translation of the Qur'an was the principal work of this collection, the Corpus Cluniacense. The undertaking was huge, taking over a year and filling over 100 folios (180 pages in modern print). This translation of the Qur'an became popular, with over 25 manuscripts still existing, together with two 16th-century prints. It was the standard translation for Europeans from its release until the 18th century.

Criticism 
Despite its success and early influence, much scholarly consensus deems the text unreliable.
Thomas E. Burman states, "from the 15th century to the present, scholarly opinion has condemned it as a loose, misleading paraphrase". Juan de Segovia, a 15th-century translator of the Qur'an, criticised the translation for the liberties Robert of Ketton took with it. The traditional 114 suras had been expanded into more, and Juan de Segovia claimed that the explicit from the Arabic was often left out while the implicit was included, not to mention numerous order changes. Ludovico Marracci, Hadrian Reland, and George Sale all criticized the translation with Sale even stating that it "deserve[d] not the name of a translation". Nevertheless, the text was widely used as the first comprehensive translation of the Qur'an into Latin.

Muslim–Christian relations 
Peter the Venerable's explicit purpose for commissioning the translation was the conversion of Muslims. Catholics (see also the translation by Mark of Toledo) were translating the works of an opposing or competing religion.

Sample texts 
The translation's opening and the Sura Al Fatiha:

Sura Al-Baqara ayah 28 in comparative translation:

This example shows the tendency of Robert of Ketton's translation to rework the original structure of the Qur'an compared to the very literal interpretation of his contemporary Mark of Toledo.  Both of these can be compared to the widely accepted modern translation in order to show the differences between modern and medieval translation practices.  With Burman's translation of a translation, some meaning of the original text may be lost.

See also 
 List of translations of the Qur'an
 Manuscripts

Notes

References 
Thomas E. Burman. Tafsir and Translation: Traditional Arabic Quran Exegesis and the Latin Qurans of Robert of Ketton and Mark of Toledo. Speculum, Vol. 73, No. 3. (Jul., 1998), pp. 703–732. <Stable URL>

Further reading 
 Bosworth, C. E. "The Study of Islam in British Scholarship" in Mapping Islamic Studies: Genealogy, Continuity and Change, ed. Azim Nanji; Religion and Reason, 38; Berlin and New York: Mouton de Gruyter, 1997, pp. 45–67; cited in Holloway (2006).

External links 
 The latin Qu'ran, as edited by Bibliander (1550 revised edition, complete text online)
The first rendering of the Koran into a western language

Quran translations
12th-century Latin books
Translations into Latin